The Glasgow and West of Scotland Association for Women’s Suffrage was an organisation involved in campaigning for women’s suffrage, based in Glasgow, with members from all over the west of Scotland.

Formation
The association met for the first time in 1902, in the home of founding president  Mrs Greig, at 18 Lynedoch Crescent, Glasgow, and affiliated to the National Union of Women's Suffrage Societies the following year. Further meetings (until 1909) were held in the offices of the Scottish Council for Women's Trades at 58 Renfield Street. Greig was, for many years president of the Glasgow Women's Liberal Association, and, along with fellow members Alice McLaren, Elizabeth Margaret Pace, Grace Paterson & Margaret Irwin was also a member of the GCWT.

Activities
The organisation is considered to be a non-militant suffrage association, and although it welcomed male members, it was organised and led by women. Their methods of influence included drawing-room meetings, addressed by prominent male and female suffragists, as well as networking with other organisations, such as The Primrose League, West of Scotland Women's Liberal Unionist Association, Scottish Women's Liberal Federation, Glasgow Council for Women's Trades & British Women's Temperance Association.

The close links between the Glasgow Council for Women's Trades have been noted by Elspeth King: "There is no doubt that the Suffrage Society of 1902 was essentially the child of the Scottish Council for Women's Trades. The frenetic attempts of the executive committee to persuade the Countess of Aberdeen, Ishbel Hamilton-Gordon, Marchioness of Aberdeen and Temair to accept the presidency was due to the fact that she had been President of the parent body since its inception, and President of the International Council of Women since 1893." The countess was unable to accept the presidency, presumably owing to her workload.

Elspeth King notes that the social status of the members was a key driver of their activities. " [It] helped to attract the support of a succession of Liberal Lord Provosts and Town Councillors, and Members of Parliament."

From the earliest days, members of the organisation travelled throughout the West of Scotland, addressing meetings and facilitating the setting up of branches of the organisation, in places such as Greenock, Motherwell  and Kilmacolm, the latter in cooperation with the Kilmacolm Women's Liberal Association. They also took their campaign with them as they travelled doon the watter to the Clyde coastal resorts, such as Helensburgh, Troon, Saltcoats, Dunoon and Rothesay. A branch of the association was established in Greenock, in 1904.

In November 1907, a deputation met with the Prime Minister, Lloyd George at the North British Station Hotel. "He was asked by Mrs Hunter for a pledge that the Government would bring in a women's suffrage Bill before this Parliament came to the end of its career."

During the war, the organisation suspended political campaigning, running a series of lectures instead. In the advertisements, they identified themselves as "non-party, non-militant" and "law-abiding", in order to distinguish themselves from the more militant groups, such as the Women's Social and Political Union.

Evolution

After the Representation of the People Act 1918 was passed, the Association quickly moved on to promoting women candidates in local government elections. The Women's Local Representation Joint Committee was formed of a number of different organisations with similar aims. These were the Voters' Council, the Women's Educational Union, the Glasgow Women's Citizens' Association, a body formed by members of the Women's Freedom League, the National Council of Women, and the Glasgow Society for Women's Suffrage. It was chaired by Mary Anderson Snodgrass who would go on to be a Town Councillor and Bailie of the city of Glasgow. This coalition of organisations had the role of a pressure group, promoting legislation favourable to women.

In 1933, the societies were dissolved for financial reason; however, the women continued to meet in Queen Margaret Union at University of Glasgow until the 1960s.

Notable members
Members included:

 Janie Allan
 Mrs Ballantyne
 Andrew Ballantyne
 Miss Baker
 Margaret J Barlas
 Mrs Beith
 Miss M Blackie
 Miss Burnett
 Professor Edward Caird and Mrs Caird 
 Miss Mary Campbell
 Miss Campbell
 Professor Cooper
 Martha Frame
 Mrs Greenlees
 Marion Gilchrist (Doctor)
 Mrs Greig (Founding chair of executive committee and Former president of the Glasgow Women's Liberal Association)
 Nellie Hunter 
 Margaret Irwin (trade unionist)
 Dr Thomas Martin Lindsay and Mrs Lindsay
 Dr Alice McLaren
 Dr Elizabeth Margaret Pace
 Grace Paterson
 Mrs Paxton
 Professor GA Smith
 Mary Anderson Snodgrass
 Mrs C Young (Treasurer)

Further reading

 King, Elspeth (1978) The Scottish Women’s Suffrage Movement. Glasgow. People’s Palace Museum 
 Leneman, Leah (1995) A Guid Cause: The Women’s Suffrage Movement in Scotland. Edinburgh. Mercat Press.
 Leneman, Leah (2000) The Scottish Suffragettes. Edinburgh. National Museums of Scotland. 190166340x
 Pedersen, Sarah (2017) The Scottish Suffragettes and the Press. London. Palgrave MacMillan. 9781137538338

See also

Feminism in the United Kingdom
List of suffragists and suffragettes
List of women's rights activists
List of women's rights organizations
Timeline of women's suffrage
Women's suffrage organizations

References

Feminist organisations in the United Kingdom
Organizations established in 1903
Women's suffrage in Scotland
Women's organisations based in the United Kingdom
Suffrage organisations in the United Kingdom
Clubs and societies in Glasgow